Kawagawa No.2 Dam is a gravity dam located in Tottori prefecture in Japan. The dam is used for irrigation. The catchment area of the dam is 10.5 km2. The dam impounds about   ha of land when full and can store 147 thousand cubic meters of water.

References

Dams in Tottori Prefecture
1993 establishments in Japan